Liming may refer to:

Processes 
 Liming (soil), the application of alkali to soil to neutralize soil acidity.
 Liming (leather processing), process where hides are soaked in an alkali solution to create parchment or leather
 The use of birdlime as a bird trap

Places 
 Liming New Village, Taichung, Taiwan